Douglas Municipal Airport  is a public airport located  east of the central business district of Douglas, a city in Cochise County, Arizona, United States. The airport is owned by the city of Douglas. It is not served by any commercial airlines at this time.

Facilities and aircraft

 3/21 has an asphalt pavement measuring 5,760 x 75 ft (1,756 x 23 m).
 18/36 has a dirt surface measuring 4,095 x 100 ft (1,248 x 30 m).

For the 12-month period ending July 31, 2005, the airport had 7,500 general aviation aircraft operations, an average of 20 per day.

See also
 Bisbee-Douglas International Airport
 List of airports in Arizona

References

External links
 Douglas Municipal Airport (DGL) at Arizona DOT airport directory
 

Airports established in 1928
Airports in Cochise County, Arizona
Airports on the National Register of Historic Places
1928 establishments in Arizona
Historic districts on the National Register of Historic Places in Arizona
National Register of Historic Places in Cochise County, Arizona
Transportation buildings and structures on the National Register of Historic Places in Arizona
Douglas, Arizona